Jusuf Zejnullahu (born 1944 in Democratic Federal Yugoslavia) was a Kosovar politician.

Background and early life

He was active in Kosovo politics throughout the 1980s, and occupied a number of important economic positions within the SAP Kosovo autonomic province and Yugoslavia as a whole. On 14 April 1989 he was elected a member of the Central Committee of the League of Communists of Yugoslavia from Kosovo.

Prime Minister of Kosovo

On 4 December 1989 Zejnullahu was elected Prime Minister (Chairman of the Executive Council) of the Socialist Autonomous Province of Kosovo, then part of Socialist Federal Republic of Yugoslavia.

On 3 April 1990 he and a number of other ethnic Albanian members of the Provincial Executive Council, including one of the two vice-premiers, offered their resignations, in protest at Slobodan Milošević’s measures in the region, and the handling of the separatist unrest by the local Communist Party of Kosovo.

At the 23 May session the Kosovo Assembly rejected these resignations, and the officials continued in their posts.

Declaration of Secession

Zejnullahu was later involved in the declaration of secession of July 2, 1990, after which Kosovo's Assembly and Executive Council were dissolved. He was later designated Prime Minister-in-exile of Kosovo's shadow provincial government, and arrested for his pro-independence activities.

Emigration to the United States

In 1999 he emigrated to the United States, where he remains.

Notes

References 

Living people
1944 births
League of Communists of Kosovo politicians
Yugoslav Albanians
Date of birth missing (living people)